NightRide is a network of bus routes in operation between midnight and 4.30am in Sydney, Australia. The sixteen routes are run by bus operators as listed below and allow for a nightly shutdown of the Sydney Trains commuter rail network. The NightRide network was established in mid-1989 as low-patronage late-night train services were progressively withdrawn. Services follow major roads, and some stops are some distance from the railway stations they replace. In addition, some routes serve stations on multiple railway lines. In the city, most services depart from George Street, above Town Hall station.

Normal bus fares apply to NightRide journeys.

The suspension of train services overnight allows for maintenance to occur on tracks. Passengers reportedly feel safer on buses than mostly-empty trains late at night. However, in 2014, it was reported that patronage on most NightRide routes was falling. The Tourism and Transport Forum has called for 24-hour train operations to resume.

History
The first NightRide routes, to Riverwood, Campbelltown and Sutherland, commenced in June 1989. Services to Penrith, Hornsby and Cronulla began two months later. New services were introduced to Bondi Junction in 2009; and Carlingford and Richmond in 2011.

A city loop route, called N1, was established in 2000 and cancelled two years later.

New contracts for all routes commenced 1 March 2018 with a number of routes going to different operators. The routes then became normal commuter routes under the administration of Transport for NSW instead of Sydney Trains. Changes included N100 Railway Square to Bondi Junction which commenced in 2009 ceasing, replaced by route N91 in conjunction with frequency changes to some routes.

From 23 August 2020, two additional routes, N31 and N92 were introduced, and all N71 services standardised to operate to Richmond.

Network
As of 23 April 2022 the network consists of

Note: Routes N61 and N81 operate early morning on Friday, Saturday and Sunday only.

References

Bus routes in Sydney
Bus transport in Sydney
Night bus service
1989 establishments in Australia